The 2014–15 Segunda División B season will be the 38th since its establishment. The first matches of the season were played on 23 August 2014, and the season ended on 21 June 2015 with the promotion play-off finals.

Summary before the 2014–15 season 
Playoffs de Ascenso:

 Racing de Santander (P)
 Racing de Ferrol
 Real Avilés
 CD Guijuelo
 Sestao River Club
 CD Leganés (P)
 CD Toledo
 Las Palmas Atlético
 UE Llagostera (P)
 CE L'Hospitalet
 Lleida Esportiu
 Gimnàstic
 Albacete (P)
 La Hoya Lorca
 FC Cartagena
 Cádiz CF

Relegated from Segunda División:
 Real Murcia (administrative relegation)
 Real Madrid Castilla
 Real Jaén
 Hércules CF

Promoted from Tercera División:

 CD Lealtad (from Group 2)
 SD Leioa (from Group 4)
 UE Cornellà (from Group 5)
 Real Valladolid B (from Group 8)
 Marbella FC (from Group 9)
 RCD Mallorca B (from Group 11)
 UCAM Murcia CF (from Group 13)
 CF Villanovense (from Group 14)
 Real Zaragoza B (from Group 17)
 Real Betis B (from Group 10)
 San Roque de Lepe (from Group 10)
 CD Eldense (from Group 6)
 Atlético Astorga FC (from Group 8)
 CF Trival Valderas  (from Group 7)
 UD Somozas (from Group 1)
 UP Langreo (from Group 2)
 UD Socuéllamos  (from Group 18)

Relegated:

 Caudal Deportivo
 SD Logroñés
 Celta de Vigo B
 SD Noja
 CD Laudio
 CD Puerta Bonita
 Peña Sport FC
 CD Sariñena
 AE Prat
 Levante UD B
 CE Constància
 Ontinyent CF
 Algeciras CF
 La Roda CF
 San Fernando CD
 Atlético Sanluqueño
 Écija Balompié

Administrative relegation:
 CD Ourense (financial trouble)
 Real Madrid C (due to the relegation of Real Madrid Castilla from Segunda División)
 CD Puertollano (resigned to promote from Group 18)

Occupied the vacant spots by administrative relegations:
 Rayo Vallecano B (occupied the vacant spot of Real Madrid C)
 Celta de Vigo B (bought the spot of CD Ourense)
 La Roda (bought the spot of CD Puertollano)

Groups

Group 1

Stadia and locations

League table

Top goalscorers
Last updated 17 May 2015

Top goalkeepers
Last updated 17 May 2015

Results

Group 2

Stadia and locations

League table

Top goalscorers
Last updated 17 May 2015

Top goalkeepers
Last updated 17 May 2015

Results

Group 3

Stadia and locations

League table

Top goalscorers
Last updated 17 May 2015

Top goalkeepers
Last updated 17 May 2015

Results

Group 4

Stadia and location

League table

Top goalscorers
Last updated 17 May 2015

Top goalkeepers
Last updated 17 May 2015

Results

See also
 2014–15 La Liga
 2014–15 Segunda División
 2015 Segunda División B play-offs
 2014–15 Tercera División
 2014–15 Copa del Rey

References

External links
Royal Spanish Football Federation

 

 
2014-15
3
Spa